The 1993 NASCAR Busch Series began February 13 and ended November 13, with Steve Grissom of Grissom Racing Enterprises winning the championship.

Teams and drivers
List of full-time teams at the start of 1993.

Races

Goody's 300 

The Goody's 300 was held February 13 at Daytona International Speedway. Ken Schrader won the pole.

Top ten results

 3-Dale Earnhardt
 52-Ken Schrader
 7-Harry Gant
 14-Terry Labonte
 72-Tracy Leslie
 8-Jeff Burton
 17-Darrell Waltrip
 44-David Green
 87-Joe Nemechek
 5-Richard Lasater

Failed to qualify: #0 Rick Mast, #09 Scott Herberg, #18 Chad Mader, #29 Phil Parsons, #51 Jeff Purvis, #53 Tony Siscone, #58 Daniel Rogers, #60 Mark Martin, #70 Alan Russell
 After Mark Martin failed to qualify, his car owner Jack Roush bought out the #32 Chevrolet ride owned and driven by Dale Jarrett. Martin would start 34th. However he would crash out of the race on lap 39 and finish 42nd.

Goodwrench 200 

The Goodwrench 200 was held February 27 at North Carolina Speedway. Joe Nemechek won the pole.

Top ten results

 60-Mark Martin
 59-Robert Pressley
 3-Dale Earnhardt
 31-Steve Grissom
 44-David Green
 19-Tom Peck
 7-Harry Gant
 57-Jason Keller
 75-Butch Miller
 63-Chuck Bown

Hardee's 200 

The Hardee's 200 was held March 6 at Richmond International Raceway. Rick Mast won the pole.

Top ten results

 60-Mark Martin
 87-Joe Nemechek
 8-Jeff Burton
 44-David Green
 59-Robert Pressley
 99-Ricky Craven
 19-Tom Peck
 0-Rick Mast
 34-Todd Bodine
 75-Butch Miller

Failed to qualify: #15 Clay Brown, #48 Tom Hessert Jr., #57 Jason Keller, #61 Chad Chaffin, #66 Nathan Buttke, #70 Alan Russell, #97 Joe Bessey

Mark III Vans 200 

The Mark III Vans 200 was held March 27 at Darlington Raceway. David Green won the pole.

Top ten results

 59-Robert Pressley
 7-Harry Gant
 14-Terry Labonte
 2-Ward Burton
 34-Todd Bodine
 44-David Green
 72-Tracy Leslie
 92-Larry Pearson
 32-Dale Jarrett
 11-Bill Elliott

Budweiser 250 

The Budweiser 250 was held April 3 at Bristol Motor Speedway. Ward Burton won the pole.

Top ten results

 30-Michael Waltrip
 34-Todd Bodine
 31-Steve Grissom
 87-Joe Nemechek
 16-Jeff Green
 25-Hermie Sadler
 8-Jeff Burton
 44-David Green
 14-Terry Labonte
 59-Robert Pressley

Mountain Dew 400 

The Mountain Dew 400 was held April 10 at Hickory Motor Speedway. Ernie Irvan won the pole.

Top ten results

 31-Steve Grissom
 99-Ricky Craven
 87-Joe Nemechek
 6-Tommy Houston
 34-Todd Bodine
 44-David Green
 19-Tom Peck
 63-Chuck Bown
 25-Hermie Sadler
 9-Mike Wallace

Failed to qualify: Charlie Brown, Troy Beebe, Nathan Buttke, Tim Fedewa, Jerry Glanville, Eddie Goodson, Tom Hessert Jr., Robert Huffman, Mike McCurry, Roy Payne, Alan Russell, #23 Kenny Gragg
 None of the current full time Cup regulars that started (four) finished the race. Bobby Hamilton finished 23rd (crashed out), Mark Martin finished 26th (crashed out), Ernie Irvan finished 27th (crashed out), and Dale Jarrett finished 29th (engine failure).

Roses Stores 300 

The Roses Stores 300 was held May 1 at Orange County Speedway. Jeff Green won the pole.

Top ten results

 2-Ward Burton
 92-Larry Pearson
 31-Steve Grissom
 97-Joe Bessey
 75-Butch Miller
 63-Chuck Bown
 72-Tracy Leslie
 8-Jeff Burton
 08-Bobby Dotter
 19-Tom Peck

Failed to qualify: #82 Jerry Glanville

Miller Genuine Draft 500 

The Miller Genuine Draft 500 was held May 8 at Martinsville Speedway. Butch Miller won the pole.

Top ten results

 2-Ward Burton
 14-Bobby Labonte
 99-Ricky Craven
 25-Hermie Sadler
 63-Chuck Bown
 44-David Green
 8-Jeff Burton
 31-Steve Grissom
 74-Jack Sprague
 1-Rodney Combs

Failed to qualify: Tom Hessert Jr.
 Robert Pressley and Ed Berrier were involved in a rough driving incident on the track. They hit each other's cars numerous times. NASCAR officials ruled that both drivers were equally at fault. Therefore they were both ejected from the race. Pressley finished 22nd and Berrier finished 23rd.
 This was the final Busch Grand National race victory for manufacturer Buick.

Laneco 200 

The Laneco 200 was held May 23 at Nazareth Speedway. Todd Bodine won the pole.

Top ten results

 59-Robert Pressley
 31-Steve Grissom
 2-Ward Burton
 44-David Green
 75-Butch Miller
 63-Chuck Bown
 55-Tim Fedewa
 99-Ricky Craven
 51-Mike McLaughlin
 1-Rodney Combs

 This was Pressley's penultimate Busch Grand National race victory.

Champion 300 

The Champion 300 was held May 29 at Charlotte Motor Speedway. Tracy Leslie won the pole.

Top ten results

 30-Michael Waltrip
 4-Ernie Irvan
 32-Dale Jarrett
 52-Ken Schrader
 59-Robert Pressley
 29-Phil Parsons
 23-Chad Little
 63-Chuck Bown
 8-Jeff Burton
 0-Rick Mast

 Ward Burton looked to have this race won, but his team mistakenly put the tires on the wrong side of the car during the last set of pit stops, which took away his car's handling for the final 16 laps and contributed to his 11th place finish.

Goodwrench/Delco 200 

The Goodwrench/Delco 200 was held June 5 at Dover International Speedway. Ward Burton won the pole.

Top ten results

 34-Todd Bodine
 23-Chad Little
 8-Jeff Burton
 32-Dale Jarrett
 29-Phil Parsons
 92-Larry Pearson
 59-Robert Pressley
 99-Ricky Craven
 64-Jimmy Spencer
 14-Terry Labonte

Carolina Pride/Budweiser 250 

The Carolina Pride/Budweiser 250 was held June 12 at Myrtle Beach Speedway. Ward Burton won the pole.

Top ten results

 8-Jeff Burton
 2-Ward Burton
 87-Joe Nemechek
 59-Robert Pressley
 31-Steve Grissom
 34-Todd Bodine
 72-Tracy Leslie
 44-David Green
 27-Roy Payne
 98-Jim Bown

 This was the first time brothers finished 1-2 in a Busch Grand National race.

Fay's 150 

The Fay's 150 was held June 26 at Watkins Glen International. Ernie Irvan won the pole.

Top ten results

 11-Bill Elliott
 14-Terry Labonte
 2-Ward Burton
 87-Joe Nemechek
 34-Todd Bodine
 63-Chuck Bown
 72-Tracy Leslie
 19-Tom Peck
 08-Bobby Dotter
 9-Mike Wallace

Failed to qualify: #5N Barney McRae, #24 Eddie Sharp, #69 Jeff Spraker, #93 Troy Beebe
 This would be Elliott's only Busch Series victory
 The race started under the Green and Yellow flags to allow the track to finish drying.

Havoline Formula 3 250 

The Havoline Formula 3 250 was held July 4 at The Milwaukee Mile, the first Busch Grand National race at the track in 8 years. Bobby Dotter won the pole.

Top ten results

 31-Steve Grissom
 92-Larry Pearson
 25-Hermie Sadler
 44-David Green
 19-Tom Peck
 8-Jeff Burton
 55-Tim Fedewa
 1-Rodney Combs
 87-Joe Nemechek
 99-Ricky Craven

 This was Davey Allison's final Busch Grand National race. He would finish 27th after completing 200 of the 250 laps due to engine failure.

Fram Filter 500K 

The Fram Filter 500K was held July 24 at Talladega Superspeedway. Bill Elliott won the pole.

Top ten results

 3-Dale Earnhardt
 20-Randy LaJoie
 14-Terry Labonte
 72-Tracy Leslie
 11-Bill Elliott
 30-Michael Waltrip
 59-Robert Pressley
 48-Sterling Marlin
 25-Hermie Sadler
 99-Ricky Craven

 Richard Lasater flipped in this race.
 This was Dale Earnhardt's penultimate Busch Grand National victory.

Kroger 200 

The Kroger 200 was held July 31 at Indianapolis Raceway Park. Ernie Irvan won the pole.

Top ten results

 72-Tracy Leslie
 44-David Green
 14-Terry Labonte
 2-Ward Burton
 55-Tim Fedewa
 9-Mike Wallace
 99-Ricky Craven
 8-Jeff Burton
 38-Bobby Hamilton
 6-Tommy Houston

 This was Tracy Leslie's only Busch Grand National race victory.

Detroit Gasket 200 

The Detroit Gasket 200 was held August 14 at Michigan International Speedway. Bill Elliott won the pole.

Top ten results

 60-Mark Martin
 59-Robert Pressley
 14-Terry Labonte
 31-Steve Grissom
 75-Rick Wilson
 99-Ricky Craven
 34-Todd Bodine
 52-Ken Schrader
 74-Jack Sprague
 63-Chuck Bown

 This was the Busch Grand National Series debut for Bill Elliott's nephew, the late Casey Elliott. He finished 1 lap down in 20th.
 This was also the Busch Grand National Series debut of Johnny Benson. On the backstretch, after he completed the 1st lap he tumbled end over end and finished 40th.
 Dale Earnhardt after finishing 2nd on track had an issue in post-race inspection. He was disqualified for the car having an Illegal carburetor and placed in last (41st).

NE Chevy 250 

The NE Chevy 250 was held August 22 at New Hampshire International Speedway. Joe Nemechek won the pole.

Top ten results

 59-Robert Pressley
 87-Joe Nemechek
 08-Bobby Dotter
 31-Steve Grissom
 61-Tommy Houston
 55-Tim Fedewa
 25-Hermie Sadler
 99-Ricky Craven
 44-David Green
 92-Larry Pearson

This was Pressley's last career NASCAR Busch Series victory.

Food City 250 

The Food City 250 was held August 27 at Bristol Motor Speedway. Steve Grissom won the pole.

Top ten results

 34-Todd Bodine
 87-Joe Nemechek
 08-Bobby Dotter
 9-Mike Wallace
 63-Chuck Bown
 99-Ricky Craven
 31-Steve Grissom
 6-Tommy Houston
 79-Dave Rezendes
 75-Rick Wilson

Gatorade 200 

The Gatorade 200 was held September 4 at Darlington Raceway. Ricky Craven won the pole.

Top ten results

 60-Mark Martin
 20-Randy LaJoie
 23-Chad Little
 87-Joe Nemechek
 31-Steve Grissom
 72-Tracy Leslie
 22-Ed Berrier
 9-Mike Wallace
 99-Ricky Craven
 0-Rick Mast

Failed to qualify: #24 Eddie Sharp

Autolite 250 

The Autolite 250 was held September 10 at Richmond International Raceway. Chuck Bown won the pole.

Top ten results

 60-Mark Martin
 72-Tracy Leslie
 25-Hermie Sadler
 0-Tommy Houston
 11-Bill Elliott
 08-Bobby Dotter
 44-David Green
 97-Joe Bessey
 32-Dale Jarrett
 31-Steve Grissom

Failed to qualify: #1 Rodney Combs, #5 Richard Lasater, #6 Tommy Houston, #9 Mike Wallace, #12 David Bonnett, #15 Clay Brown, #16 Chad Chaffin, #17 Darrell Waltrip, #35 Shawna Robinson, #39 Mike Hovis, #46 Steve Hoddick, #57 Jason Keller, #73 Brian Ross, #79 Dave Rezendes, #94 Casey Elliott

Driver changes: #0 Rick Mast (driven by Tommy Houston, was relieved by Mast mid race, finished in 4th place), #64 Jimmy Spencer (driven by Mike Wallace to 33rd place)

SplitFire 200 

The SplitFire 200 was held September 18 at Dover International Speedway. Terry Labonte won the pole.

Top ten results

 34-Todd Bodine
 99-Ricky Craven
 72-Tracy Leslie
 74-Jack Sprague
 44-David Green
 10-Jimmy Spencer
 31-Steve Grissom
 29-Phil Parsons
 9-Mike Wallace
 97-Joe Bessey

Polaroid 300 

The Polaroid 300 was held October 2 at Orange County Speedway. Joe Nemechek won the pole.

Top ten results

 25-Hermie Sadler
 99-Ricky Craven
 63-Chuck Bown
 74-Randy LaJoie
 08-Bobby Dotter
 44-David Green
 19-Tom Peck
 72-Tracy Leslie
 4-Jack Sprague
 97-Joe Bessey

 This was Hermie Sadler's first Busch Grand National Series race victory.

All Pro 300 

The All Pro 300 was held October 9 at Charlotte Motor Speedway. Bobby Dotter won the pole.

Top ten results

 60-Mark Martin
 30-Michael Waltrip
 3-Dale Earnhardt
 11-Bill Elliott
 34-Todd Bodine
 14-Terry Labonte
 2-Ward Burton
 63-Chuck Bown
 08-Bobby Dotter
 9-Mike Wallace

Failed to qualify: Dirk Stephens, #07 George Crenshaw, #10 Jimmy Spencer, #17 Darrell Waltrip, #22 Ed Berrier, #24 Eddie Sharp, #28 Tim Steele, #35 Shawna Robinson, #36 Tim Bender, #56 Brandon Sperling, #66 Nathan Buttke, #84 Robert Powell, #91 Stanton Barrett, #91 Steve Perry, #98 Jim Bown
 This was Robert Pressley's last race for the #59 Daniel Welch owned team. He fell out of the race after completing 16 laps due to engine failure finishing 43rd.
 This was also the last Busch Grand National start for Casey Elliott, nephew of Bill Elliott. He crashed out of the race on lap 16 finishing last (44th)
 This race featured a halftime break.

Advance Auto Parts 500 

The Advance Auto Parts 500 was held October 17 at Martinsville Speedway. Joe Nemechek won the pole.

Top ten results

 63-Chuck Bown
 31-Steve Grissom
 99-Ricky Craven
 75-Jimmy Hensley
 19-Tom Peck
 44-David Green
 9-Mike Wallace
 72-Tracy Leslie
 74-Ernie Irvan
 59-Dennis Setzer

Failed to qualify: Steve Darne, Pat Davison, Tommy Ellis, Jamie James, Buckshot Jones, Steve McEachern, #07 George Crenshaw, #12 David Bonnett, #48 Tom Hessert Jr., #93 Troy Beebe
 This was Chuck Bown's final Busch Grand National Series win.
 This was Setzer's first race for the #59 Daniel Welch owned team.
 Robert Pressley made his debut for the #0 Richard Jackson owned team. He had 2 spins in the race and finished 15 laps down in 23rd.

AC-Delco 200 

The AC-Delco 200 was held October 23 at North Carolina Speedway. Ward Burton won the pole.

Top ten results

 60-Mark Martin
 2-Ward Burton
 97-Joe Bessey
 34-Todd Bodine
 14-Terry Labonte
 72-Tracy Leslie
 31-Steve Grissom
 20-Randy LaJoie
 0-Robert Pressley
 99-Ricky Craven

Failed to qualify: Tommy Ellis, Stevie Reeves, #29 Phil Parsons, #57 Jason Keller, #59 Dennis Setzer, #74 Johnny Benson
 During the race there was a dust-up between Joe Bessey and Jimmy Spencer. It later became a brawl, and led to Spencer being fined plus suspended for the rest of the year from the series.

The Pantry 500 

The Pantry 500 was held November 7 at Hickory Motor Speedway. Bobby Labonte won the pole.

Top ten results

 00-Johnny Rumley
 63-Chuck Bown
 6-Tommy Houston
 99-Ricky Craven
 05-Tommy Ellis
 08-Bobby Dotter
 32-Dale Jarrett
 66-Nathan Buttke
 31-Steve Grissom
 34-Todd Bodine

Failed to qualify: Steve Darne, Pat Davison, Mike Dillon, Andy Houston, Buckshot Jones, Mike McCurry, Steve McEachern, Ronnie Silver, #5 Richard Lasater, #12 David Bonnett, #16 Chad Chaffin, #21 Tommy Sigmon, #35 Shawna Robinson, #55 Tim Fedewa, #56 Brandon Sperling, #97 Joe Bessey

 Because David Green finished 17th, with his 9th place finish Steve Grissom clinched the championship with 1 race remaining.
 This was the final Busch Grand National victory for manufacturer Oldsmobile.
 This was also the final race Neil Bonnett would call on TV (TNN) before his death in February 1994.
 This race was called 500 because there was a 200 lap late model race in addition to the Busch Grand National race.

Slick 50 300 

The Slick 50 300 was held November 13 at Atlanta Motor Speedway. Mark Martin won the pole. This race was delayed 8 months due to a blizzard.

Top ten results

 2-Ward Burton
 92-Larry Pearson
 30-Michael Waltrip
 7-Harry Gant
 70-Sterling Marlin
 87-Joe Nemechek
 0-Robert Pressley
 9-Mike Wallace
 31-Steve Grissom
 19-Tom Peck

 This was Ward Burton's final Busch Grand National race victory.
 This was Neil Bonnett's last Busch Grand National race before his death in February 1994. He crashed out on lap 84, finishing 35th driving for Dale Earnhardt. He gave a funny TV interview stating "We were supposed to go hunting next week. I don't think I'm gonna go, Dale might shoot me!"

Final points standings 

Steve Grissom - 3846
Ricky Craven - 3593
David Green - 3584
Chuck Bown - 3532
Joe Nemechek - 3443
Ward Burton - 3413
Bobby Dotter - 3406
Robert Pressley - 3389
Todd Bodine - 3387
Hermie Sadler - 3362
Tracy Leslie - 3336
Mike Wallace - 3213
Tom Peck - 3211
Jeff Burton - 3030
Rodney Combs - 2969
Tommy Houston - 2852
Joe Bessey - 2834
Tim Fedewa - 2775
Jack Sprague - 2429
Terry Labonte - 2399
Richard Lasater - 2339
Roy Payne - 2276
Shawna Robinson - 1950
Mark Martin - 1744
Larry Pearson - 1662
Jim Bown - 1564
Harry Gant - 1526
Nathan Buttke - 1490
Bill Elliott - 1276
Michael Waltrip - 1240
Butch Miller - 1182
Chad Little - 1171
Jason Keller - 1137
Dale Jarrett - 1130
Ken Schrader - 1066
Randy LaJoie - 1045
Dale Earnhardt - 989
Dave Rezendes - 949
Ernie Irvan - 901
Jeff Green -  894
Sterling Marlin - 864
Jimmy Spencer - 838
Phil Parsons - 813
Rick Wilson - 722
Ed Berrier - 647
Troy Beebe - 641
Bobby Hamilton - 594
Johnny Rumley - 559
Rick Mast - 535
Darrell Waltrip - 513

Full Drivers' Championship

(key) Bold – Pole position awarded by time. Italics – Pole position set by owner's points. * – Most laps led.

Rookie of the Year 
Hermie Sadler won his first career race and the Rookie of the Year title in 1993, finishing in the top-ten eight times and ended the season tenth in the final standings. He was followed by Joe Bessey, Tim Fedewa, and Roy Payne. Due to sponsor issues, Nathan Buttke and Jason Keller did not attempt the full schedule.

See also 
 1993 NASCAR Winston Cup Series

References

External links 
Busch Series standings and statistics for 1993

NASCAR Xfinity Series seasons